Randy Joe Jackson (November 13, 1948 – July 21, 2010) was an American football running back in the National Football League (NFL). He played for the Buffalo Bills, the San Francisco 49ers, and the Philadelphia Eagles, having played college football at Wichita State University. After retiring, he taught physical education and coached basketball at Robinson Middle School (Wichita, Kansas) for more than 30 years.

Randy Jackson was one of nine survivors of the Wichita State University football team plane crash.

He died on July 21, 2010 at the age of 61 from pancreatic cancer.

External links
Obituary

1948 births
2010 deaths
People from Atlanta, Texas
Players of American football from Texas
American football running backs
Wichita State Shockers football players
Buffalo Bills players
San Francisco 49ers players
Philadelphia Eagles players
Deaths from pancreatic cancer